is a 2006 compilation album by Japanese rock band GO!GO!7188.

Track listing
 Koi no Uta (こいのうた) (Love Song)
 C7
 Thunder Girl (Kanden Version) (サンダーガール(感電ヴァージョン) (Thunder Girl - Electric Shock Version)
 Kunoichi (くのいち) (Female ninja)
 Taiyō (太陽) (Sun)
 Dotanba de Cancel (ドタン場でキャンセル) (A Last-minute Cancellation)
 Tsuki to Kōra (月と甲羅) (The Moon and a Shell)
 Kangaegoto (考え事) (Thoughts)
 Ruriiro (瑠璃色) (Azure)
 Jet Ninjin (ジェットにんぢん) (Jet Carrot)
 Tokage 3-gō (とかげ3号) (Lizard #3)
 Otona no Kusuri (大人のくすり) (Adult Medicine)
 Otona no Himitsu (大人のひみつ) (The Secrets of Adults)
 Rock (ロック)
 Bungu (文具) (Stationery)
 Ukifune (浮舟) (Floating Boat)
 Kami-sama no Hima Tsubushi (神様のヒマ潰し) (God's Spare Time)

Bonus Disc

 Pa-Pa-Pantsu ~ Pre-Debut Edit
 Koi no Uta ~ Pre-Debut Edit

GO!GO!7188 albums
2006 greatest hits albums